Bridge was a station on the Elham Valley Railway. It opened in 1889 and closed to passengers in 1940 and freight in 1947.

History
The station opened on 1 July 1889. An 18-lever signal box was provided. Initially, there were six passenger trains per day. By 1906 there were nine trains a day, with five on Sunday. This had reduced to six trains a day by 1922. The double track between Lyminge and Harbledown Junction was reduced to single track from 25 October 1931 and the signal boxes between those points were abolished. Services had been reduced to five trains a day by 1937.

The station remained open to freight during the war. Military control was relinquished on 19 February 1945. The Elham Valley Railway closed on 1 October 1947. The station building was converted into a dwelling in 1948.

References
Citations

Sources
 

Canterbury
Railway stations in Great Britain opened in 1889
Railway stations in Great Britain closed in 1947
Disused railway stations in Kent
Former South Eastern Railway (UK) stations
1889 establishments in England
1947 disestablishments in England